The South Dakota State Jackrabbits women's basketball team is part of the athletic program at South Dakota State University in Brookings, South Dakota. The NCAA Division I team is a member of The Summit League.  The Jackrabbits head coach is Aaron Johnston.

History
South Dakota State began play in 1966. In the times they were in the AIAW, they won the State title 11 times from 1969 to 1982, including six straight from 1969 to 1975, including a Regional title in 1972. In their time in Division II, they made the NCAA Division II women's basketball tournament in 1988, 1992, 1994, 1995, 1996, 1999, 2002, 2003, and 2004. They garnered a record of 18–8. In 2003, they won an NCAA Division II national title when they defeated Northern Kentucky by a score of 65–50. They began play in Division I in 2004. Prior to joining the Division I Summit League, they were a member of the Division II North Central Conference. As of the end of the 2020–21 season they have a 1039–438 all-time record, which is tied for 11th-most Division I wins all-time.

The Jackrabbits played in the NCAA Women's Division I Basketball Championship in each of their first five years of eligibility, 2009, 2010, 2011, 2012, and 2013. The also played in the NCAA D-I Basketball Championship in 2015, 2016, 2018 and 2019, making the Sweet Sixteen in 2019. The Jackrabbits played in the 2007, 2008, 2014, and 2017 Women's WNIT Tournaments. In their Division I history, the team has compiled four regular-season Summit League titles and seven Summit League postseason conference-tourney titles. The 2008–2009 team was ranked #14 in ESPN/USA Today Division I Coaches Poll en route to a 32–3 record and received large amounts of national media coverage. The 2018–2019 team was ranked as the #1 Mid-Major team and during the regular season was ranked in the top 25 overall for Division I.

Postseason appearances

NCAA Division I Tournament results

The Jackrabbits have appeared in eleven NCAA Division I Tournaments. They achieved their highest ranking in 2019 with a #6 seed. Their overall record is 5–11.

WNIT appearances
The Jackrabbits have appeared in five WNIT Tournaments. Their record is 13–4. They were the 2022 Champions.

AIAW Tournament appearances
The Jackrabbits made one appearance in the AIAW women's basketball tournament. They had a combined record of 0–2.

NCAA Division II tournament results
The Jackrabbits made nine appearances in the NCAA Division II women's basketball tournament. They had a combined record of 18–8.

Season–by–season results

Arenas
The Barn 1966–1972
Frost Arena 1973–present

Head coaches

† Aaron Johnston took over for Nancy  during the last six games of the 1999–2000 season.

 Records though 2022-23 season.

Media coverage

All home and road games are covered on the Jackrabbit Sports Network.  The broadcast range of the Jackrabbit Sports Network covers eight states (South Dakota, Minnesota, North Dakota, Iowa, Nebraska, Missouri, Kansas, and Wyoming), and consists of the following stations:
WNAX 570AM (Flagship Station)
KJJQ 910AM
KRKI 99.1FM
KGFX 1060AM
KSDR 1480AM

The team does not have an official television partner, but Jackrabbit games have been televised on Midco Sports Net, ESPN2, ESPNU, and local television networks.

References

External links